A social network hosting service is a web hosting service that specifically hosts the user creation of web-based social networking services, alongside related applications. Such services are also known as vertical social networks due to the creation of SNSes which cater to specific user interests and niches; like larger, interest-agnostic SNSes, such niche networking services may also possess the ability to create increasingly niche groups of users.

List of social network hosting services
 Federated Media Publishing's BigTent
 BroadVision Clearvale
 KickApps
 Ning
 Wall.fm

References 

Social media
Web hosting
Miles 021